Shahid Hussain Bhatti is a Pakistani politician who was a member of the National Assembly of Pakistan from September 2013 to May 2018.

Political career

He ran for the seat of the National Assembly of Pakistan as a candidate of Pakistan Muslim League (N) (PML-N) from Constituency NA-103 (Hafizabad-II) in 2008 Pakistani general election, but lost the seat to Liaqat Abbas Bhatti.

He was elected to the National Assembly as a candidate of PML-N from Constituency NA-103 (Hafizabad-II) in by-elections held in August 2013.

References

Living people
Islamia University of Bahawalpur alumni
People from Hafizabad District
Pakistan Muslim League (N) politicians
Year of birth missing (living people)
Pakistani MNAs 2013–2018